The Florida Complex League Twins are the Rookie-level affiliate of the Minnesota Twins, competing in the Florida Complex League of Minor League Baseball. The team plays in Fort Myers, Florida, at the Lee County Sports Complex. Prior to 2021, the team was known as the Gulf Coast League Twins. The team is composed mainly of players who are in their first year of professional baseball either as draftees or non-drafted free agents from the United States, Canada, Dominican Republic, Venezuela and other countries.

History

In 1965, the team first played in the league's first embodiment, the Florida Rookie League, as the Florida Rookie League Twins. The league was renamed as the Gulf Coast League for the 1966 season. The team suspended operations after the 1971 season, but returned to the GCL in 1989. Prior to the 2021 season, the league was again renamed, becoming the Florida Complex League.

The Twins compete in the league's Southern Division. In 2009, the Twins won the South with a 34–21 record under manager Jake Mauer, the older brother of former Minnesota Twins catcher Joe Mauer. They lost 1–0 in twelve innings to the wild card winning GCL Nationals in the one game playoff. Following the season, Mauer was promoted to manager of the Florida State League Fort Myers Miracle, and Chris Heintz took the reins for the Twins. Like Mauer, Heintz was also a player in the Twins organization. He coached with the Beloit Snappers the final two months of the 2009 season. In addition to managing the Rookie-level club, Heintz also ran the Twins' extended spring training.

On July 25, 2010, it was announced that Tom Brunansky, member of the 1987 Twin's championship team, accepted a job to be the hitting coach for the team.

As of the 2021 season, there is no league limit to how many players can be on an active roster, but no team can have more than three players with four or more years of minor-league experience.

Roster

Season-by-season

References

External links
 Official website

Baseball teams established in 1991
Florida Complex League teams
Professional baseball teams in Florida
Gu
Baseball in Fort Myers, Florida
1991 establishments in Florida